Stempfferia carcina, the dark furry epitola, is a butterfly in the family Lycaenidae. It is found in Nigeria (east and the Cross River loop) and Cameroon. The habitat consists of forests.

References

External links
Seitz, A. Die Gross-Schmetterlinge der Erde 13: Die Afrikanischen Tagfalter. Plate XIII 65 d

Butterflies described in 1873
Poritiinae
Butterflies of Africa
Taxa named by William Chapman Hewitson